The Team competition of the 2018 European Aquatics Championships was held on 11 August 2018.

Results
The race was started at 11:00.

References

Team
European Aquatics Championships